"Give it to Me" is a song by the American rock band The J. Geils Band. This is the band's first single to reach the Top 30 in the United States. This is the last song from the album Bloodshot.

Chart performance

Weekly charts

References

External links
 

1973 singles
The J. Geils Band songs
1973 songs
Songs written by Peter Wolf
Songs written by Seth Justman
Song recordings produced by Bill Szymczyk
Atlantic Records singles